Reynaldo Chanco Flores Jr. (born November 15, 1988), better known by his screen name Jace Flores is a Filipino former television actor and host. He joined season 1 of the reality game show Survivor Philippines in 2009. He is also a professional network marketer, and a prominent top earner in the industry.

Career
His first television appearance was in the reality television show Survivor Philippines. After the reality show ended, he played supporting roles in several GMA Network teleseryes, including Luna Mystika, Ang Babaeng Hinugot sa Aking Tadyang, Kung Aagawin Mo ang Lahat sa Akin, Broken Vow and Healing Hearts. Flores gained popularity as a host to popular television shows in GMA-11 and QTV.

Flores is currently a network marketing professional, and is among the "successful millionaires" of the industry.

Filmography

Television

Film

References

External links
 

1988 births
Living people
Filipino male models
People from Quezon City
Participants in Philippine reality television series
Survivor Philippines contestants
GMA Network personalities
Filipino motivational speakers